Ricky may refer to:

Places
Říčky, a municipality and village in the Czech Republic
Říčky, a village and part of Orlické Podhůří in the Czech Republic
Říčky v Orlických horách, a municipality and village in the Czech Republic
Rickmansworth, a town in England sometimes called "Ricky"

Film and television
Ricky (2009 film), a fantasy film
Ricky (2016 film), a Kannada thriller movie

Music
Ricky (band), a UK indie band
Ricky (album), a 1957 album by Ricky Nelson
"Ricky" (song), a 1983 song by "Weird Al" Yankovic
"Ricky" (Denzel Curry song), from the 2019 album Zuu
"Ricky" (Game song), from The R.E.D. Album, 2011

People
Ricky (footballer, born 1973), Spanish football forward
Ricky (given name), a diminutive of Richard, Enrique, Fredrick or Patrick
Ricky (musician), Japanese singer

Other uses
Ricky (dog), decorated for bravery in service during the Second World War
"Ricky" (Trailer Park Boys),

See also
Ricky's (disambiguation)
Rickey (disambiguation)
Rickie
Riki
Rikki (name)
Rick (disambiguation)